Lecompton Township is a township in Douglas County, Kansas, USA.  As of the 2000 census, its population was 1,761.

Lecompton Township was formed in about 1858. It was named for the town of Lecompton which was the territorial capital of Kansas from 185561.

Geography
According to the USGS, it contains two cemeteries: Big Springs and Lecompton.

The streams of Coon Creek, Oakley Creek and Spring Creek run through this township.

Adjacent townships
Kaw Township, Jefferson County (northwest)
Kentucky Township, Jefferson County (north)
Rural Township, Jefferson County (northeast)
Wakarusa Township, Douglas County (east)
Kanwaka Township, Douglas County (south)
Tecumseh Township, Shawnee County (west)

Towns and settlements
Although these towns may not be incorporated or populated, they are still placed on maps produced by the county.

Big Springs, located at 
Grover, located at 
Lecompton, located at

Transportation

Major highways
I-70, part of the Kansas Turnpike
U.S. Highway 40

Points of interest
The Scenic River Road.  This old country road travels along the Kansas River from Tecumseh to Lake View via Lecompton.

References

External links
 US-Counties.com
 City-Data.com

Townships in Douglas County, Kansas
Townships in Kansas